William Washington Baker (October 20, 1844 – February 21, 1927) was an American Democratic politician who served as a member of the Virginia House of Delegates, representing his native Chesterfield County.

References

External links 

1844 births
1927 deaths
Democratic Party members of the Virginia House of Delegates
19th-century American politicians
People from Chesterfield County, Virginia